Maria Eagle (born 17 February 1961) is a British politician who served in the governments of Tony Blair and Gordon Brown. She later served in the Shadow cabinets of Ed Miliband and Jeremy Corbyn. A member of the Labour Party, she has been Member of Parliament (MP) for Garston and Halewood, previously Liverpool Garston, since 1997.

The twin sister of Angela Eagle, also a Labour MP, Eagle was born in the East Riding of Yorkshire to a working-class family and raised in Merseyside. She studied Philosophy, politics and economics at Pembroke College, Oxford and read Law at the College of Law, London. After graduating with her law degree, she worked as an articled clerk and solicitor in both London and Liverpool. After unsuccessfully contesting Crosby in 1992, she was elected for the Liverpool Garston constituency at the 1997 general election. 

Under Tony Blair, Eagle was a junior minister at the Department for Work and Pensions, Department for Education and Skills and Northern Ireland Office. She was Minister of State at the Ministry of Justice and Government Equalities Office under Gordon Brown. Following the 2010 general election, Eagle became Shadow Solicitor General for England and Wales. She served in the Shadow cabinet as Shadow Transport Secretary, Shadow Environment, Food and Rural Affairs Secretary, Shadow Defence Secretary and finally Shadow Culture, Media and Sport Secretary. She resigned from the Jeremy Corbyn's Shadow Cabinet in June 2016.

She was re-elected in 2017 and 2019. She remains in the House of Commons as a backbencher.

Early life and career
Eagle was born in Bridlington, East Riding of Yorkshire, the daughter of Shirley ( Kirk), a factory worker, and André Eagle, a print worker. She was educated at St Peter's Church of England School in Formby, Merseyside and Formby High School before attending Pembroke College, Oxford, where she was awarded a Bachelor of Arts degree in Philosophy, politics and economics in 1983.

Eagle worked in the voluntary sector from 1983 to 1990, and then went to the College of Law, London, where she took her law finals in 1990, before she joined Brian Thompson & Partners in Liverpool as an articled clerk in 1990. In 1992 she became a solicitor with Goldsmith Williams in Liverpool, and later a Solicitor at Stephen Irving & Co also in Liverpool, where she remained until her election to Westminster.

Political career

Early political career 
After joining the Labour Party, Eagle was elected the secretary of the Crosby Constituency Labour Party (CLP) for two years in 1983, and was also elected as the campaigns organiser with that CLP for three years in 1993. She contested the Crosby seat at the 1992 general election where she lost to the sitting Conservative MP Malcolm Thornton by 14,806 votes. At that election, her sister Angela gained the nearby seat of Wallasey which she has held ever since.

Backbencher 
Prior to the general election in 1997, Eagle was selected through an all-women shortlist to stand for Labour in Liverpool Garston in Merseyside. She was elected to the House of Commons with a majority of 18,417. She made her maiden speech on 17 June 1997. She became a member of the Public Accounts Committee and in 1999 she was appointed the Parliamentary Private Secretary to the Minister of State at the Department of Health, John Hutton. Her proposed ban on mink fur farming was defeated as a Private member's bill but subsequently picked up by the government and enacted as the Fur Farming (Prohibition) Act 2000.

Government minister 

Eagle was promoted to the Tony Blair government following the 2001 general election as a Parliamentary Under-Secretary of State at the Department for Work and Pensions. Following the 2005 general election, she was the Minister for Children at the Department for Education and Skills, until the May 2006 reshuffle moved her to Northern Ireland, where she was minister for Employment and Learning.

Eagle was moved to the Ministry of Justice when Gordon Brown became Prime Minister in June 2007. In September 2008, she was nominated for Stonewall Politician of the Year for her work to support equality for lesbian, gay and bisexual people. As part of the government reshuffle in October 2008, she assumed additional responsibility for Equalities. In the June 2009 reshuffle, she was promoted to Minister of State. In 2010, she was given a score of 93% in favour of lesbian, gay and bisexual equality by Stonewall.

Expenses controversy

On 17 May 2009 The Daily Telegraph revealed that Eagle had claimed £3,500 for the refurbishment of the bathroom of her Liverpool home property, then switched her second home designation to a different property four months later. Eagle voted in favour of legislation which would have kept MPs' expenses information secret.

In opposition 

Eagle was returned as MP for the new constituency of Garston and Halewood at the 2010 general election, following boundary changes. After Labour lost the election, she served in interim Labour leader Harriet Harman's frontbench as Shadow Solicitor General for England and Wales and Shadow Minister for Justice. In October 2010 Eagle was elected to the Shadow cabinet of new Labour Party leader Ed Miliband as Shadow Secretary of State for Transport in the Labour Party Shadow Cabinet election. In February 2013, she voted in favour in the House of Commons Second Reading vote on marriage equality in Britain.

Eagle was appointed Shadow Secretary of State for Defence in September 2015 by the newly elected Labour leader Jeremy Corbyn. Eagle said she was surprised by her appointment as she had disagreed with Corbyn's advocacy of unilateral nuclear disarmament and supported the renewal of the Trident nuclear weapons system. Tasked with leading Labour's defence review, she said she would not rule out the possibility of it recommending unilateral disarmament. However, she described Corbyn commenting he would not countenance using a nuclear deterrent as "unhelpful" to the policy process.

In January 2016, Eagle was moved to the position of Shadow Secretary of State for Culture, Media and Sport. She resigned from the shadow cabinet on 27 June 2016 in the mass resignation of the Shadow Cabinet following the Brexit referendum. She supported Owen Smith in the failed attempt to replace Jeremy Corbyn in the 2016 Labour Party leadership election.

Eagle was re-elected in the 2017 and 2019 general elections. She is a supporter of Labour Friends of Israel.

On 15 February 2023, she was appointed as a member of the Privy Council.

Personal life
Following her initial election, Eagle joined her twin sister Angela in Parliament. Maria describes herself as "the straight one", while Angela is a lesbian.

Notes

References

Publications

 High Time or High Tide for Labour Women? by Maria Eagle and Joni Lovenduski, 1998, Fabian Society Books,

External links
Maria Eagle MP official website

|-

|-

|-

|-

|-

|-

|-

|-

|-

|-

1961 births
Alumni of Pembroke College, Oxford
British identical twins
Female members of the Parliament of the United Kingdom for English constituencies
Identical twin politicians
Labour Party (UK) MPs for English constituencies
Living people
Members of the Parliament of the United Kingdom for Liverpool constituencies
Northern Ireland Office junior ministers
People from Bridlington
People from Formby
English twins
20th-century British women politicians
21st-century British women politicians
Women government ministers in the United Kingdom
UK MPs 1997–2001
UK MPs 2001–2005
UK MPs 2005–2010
UK MPs 2010–2015
UK MPs 2015–2017
UK MPs 2017–2019
UK MPs 2019–present
20th-century English women
20th-century English people
21st-century English women
21st-century English people
Members of the Privy Council of the United Kingdom